Mignovillard is a commune in the Jura department in Bourgogne-Franche-Comté in eastern France. On 1 January 2016, the former commune of Communailles-en-Montagne was merged into Mignovillard.

Population

See also 
 Communes of the Jura department

References 

Communes of Jura (department)